Tigin is a surname. Notable people with the surname include:

 Alp Tigin, Governor of Ghazni
 Kul Tigin, Göktürk ruler
 Sabuktigin, founder of Ghaznavids
 Böritigin, Governor of Ghazni
 Bilgetegin, governor of Ghazni
 Gazi Gümüshtigin, ruler of Danishmendids
 Al-Taj Gümüshtegin, governor of Baalbek
 Toghtekin, Atabeg of Damascus
 Amin Khan Ay-Tigin, governor of Bengal